The third season of Eesti otsib superstaari premiered on September 6, 2009. The winner of the season was Ott Lepland.

In Autumn 2008 TV3 announced that the third season would be postponed. The show was replaced by new show Eesti otsib lemmiklaulu (Estonia is looking for a favourite song). In June 2009 TV3 announced that the auditions for third season will start in August 2009.

In July 2009, Estonian Public Broadcasting (ERR) announced that one of the judges, Heidy Purga, is not allowed to take part of that program. Purga is a director of ERR's radio station, Raadio 2. ERR explained that the decision was made, because there is a lot work to do in Raadio 2 at the moment and they will not allow Purga to take part in competitors program.

Several days later TV3 announced new hosts and a new judge. The hosts for the third season are a Eurovision Song Contest-winning rockstar Tanel Padar and singer Ithaka Maria. Heidy Purga was replaced by singer Maarja-Liis Ilus.

This season also produced representatives of Estonia in the Eurovision Song Contest three times in a row: Robin Juhkental, who made the semifinals on the show, represented his country as a lead singer of Malcolm Lincoln in 2010; Getter Jaani, who finished in fourth place, sang for Estonia in 2011 and Ott Lepland, the winner of the season, had his turn in 2012 achieving sixth place in the contest. Five years later, Semifinalist Elina Nechayeva scored an 8th place at the Grand Finale of the contest.

Auditions
Auditions for 2009 were held in Pärnu (August 19), Rakvere (August 26), Tartu (August 29 & 30) & Tallinn (August 22 & 23) Only about 60–80 singers qualified to the Theatre round.

Theatre rounds
Theatre rounds were held on September 7 & 8, 2009 in Vene Teater (Russian Theatre in Estonia). 25 new singers qualified to the semi-finals.

Semi-finals
Twenty-five new singers qualified to the studio rounds: 13 female and 12 male. The studio rounds take place in two weeks. First week is girls' week and the second is boys' week. During the week two shows are taking place. In the first show all girls or boys are participating. The judges have the right to send one participant directly to the final. Among others eight new singers are sent to the second show. In the second show four singers are sent to the finals by televoters.

Girls' Round 1
 Kristiina Freimane – "I Don't Want to Talk About It" by Crazy Horse
 Getter Jaani – "Ma tõde tean" by Nele-Liis Vaiksoo
 Birgit Varjun – "I Remember You" by Skid Row
 Kerli Kivilaan – "Ordinary People" by John Legend
 Liina Uibo – "Respect" by Otis Redding
 Maria Alanurme – "Hands Clean" by Alanis Morissette
 Eliisa Kõiv – "Human" by The Killers
 Anna Kutšinskaja – "Love You Inside Out" by The Bee Gees
 Liisa Orav – "Ride" by Cary Brothers
 Sabrina Abdullajeva – "Heartless" by Kanye West
 Elina Nechayeva – "Sunday Morning" by Maroon 5
 Anne Arrak – "State of Mind" by Raul Midón
 Kene Vernik – "Taking Off" by The Cure

 Eliminated: Kristiina Freimane, Maria Alanurme, Liisa Orav, Anna Kutšinskaja 
 Advanced to the final (Judges' choice): Kene Vernik

Girls' Round 2
 Getter Jaani – "Cruella de Vil" from a film One Hundred and One Dalmatians
 Kerli Kivilaan – "Ööviiul" by Erko Niit
 Elina Nechayeva – "What's Up?" by 4 Non Blondes
 Eliisa Kõiv – "No End" by The Ark
 Sabrina Abdullajeva – "Hero" by Chad Kroeger featuring Josey Scott
 Anne Arrak – "Sacrifice" by Anouk
 Liina Uibo – "Nobody's Wife" by Anouk
 Birgit Varjun – "Knockin' on Heaven's Door" by Bob Dylan

 Eliminated: Kerli Kivilaan, Elina Nechayeva, Sabrina Abdullajeva, Liina Uibo 
 Advanced to the final: Getter Jaani, Eliisa Kõiv, Anne Arrak, Birgit Varjun

Boys' Round 1
 Sten-Martin Saarest – "Olen valinud tee" by Tõnis Mägi
 Robin Juhkental – "The Way You Make Me Feel" by Michael Jackson
 Kristen Kasuk – "I Love Rock 'n' Roll" by Arrows
 Mick Pedaja – "Crazy" by Gnarls Barkley
 Andrei Ozdoba – "Get It Together" by Seal
 Marten Kuningas – "Starman" by David Bowie
 Anis Arumets – "A Modern Myth" by Thirty Seconds to Mars
 Beno Kudrin – "Broken Strings" by James Morrison
 Keito Kaljulaid – "Ain't No Sunshine" by Bill Withers
 Jaanus Saago – "In the Pines"
 Ott Lepland – "Permanent" by David Cook
 Karel Tallermaa – "Everything" by Michael Bublé

 Eliminated: Sten-Martin Saarest, Robin Juhkental, Kristen Kasuk  
 Advanced to the final (Judges' choice): Anis Arumets

Boys' Round 2
 Mick Pedaja – "Üksikud hinged" by traFFic
 Ott Lepland – "All by Myself" by Eric Carmen
 Andrei Ozdoba – "Angels" by Robbie Williams
 Beno Kudrin – "Hallelujah" by Leonard Cohen
 Jaanus Saago – "Billie Jean" by Michael Jackson
 Karel Tallermaa – "Love Foolosophy" by Jamiroquai
 Keito Kaljulaid – "Tears in Heaven" by Eric Clapton
 Marten Kuningas – "Gold" by Spandau Ballet

Eliminated: Karel Tallermaa, Beno Kudrin, Keito Kaljulaid, Mick Pedaja
Advanced to the final: Marten Kuningas, Ott Lepland, Andrei Ozdoba, Jaanus Saago

Finalists
(Ages stated at time of contest)

Finals

Top 10: Pop-hits
 Marten Kuningas – "Song 2" by Blur
 Getter Jaani – "Iseendale" by Eda-Ines Etti
 Birgit Varjun – "Cryin'" by Aerosmith
 Andrei Ozdoba – "Elevation" by U2
 Ott Lepland – "Everybody Hurts" by R.E.M.
 Kene Vernik – "Wicked Game" by Chris Isaak
 Jaanus Saago – "Black Hole Sun" by Soundgarden
 Anne Arrak – "With or Without You" by U2
 Eliisa Kõiv – "They Don't Care About Us" by Michael Jackson
 Anis Arumets – "Can't Take My Eyes off You" by Frankie Valli

Bottom three: Getter Jaani, Jaanus Saago, Anne Arrak 
Bottom two: Getter Jaani, Anne Arrak 
Eliminated:  No one

Top 10: Songs from TV show "Eesti otsib lemmiklaulu"
 Andrei Ozdoba – "Aeg ei peatu" by Apelsin
 Anne Arrak – "Rahu" by Ruja
 Ott Lepland – "Eestlane olen ja eestlaseks jään" by Alo Mattiisen
 Anis Arumets – "Juulikuu lumi" by Terminaator
 Getter Jaani – "Laul põhjamaast" by Ülo Vinter
 Marten Kuningas – "Mägede hääl" by Mahavok
 Jaanus Saago – "Valgus" by Gunnar Graps
 Birgit Varjun – "Eesti muld ja Eesti süda" by Ruja
 Eliisa Kõiv – "Depressiivsed Eesti väikelinnad" by HU?
 Kene Vernik – "Massikommunikatsioon" by Singer Vinger

Bottom three: Andrei Ozdoba, Anis Arumets, Eliisa Kõiv
Eliminated: Andrei Ozdoba, Eliisa Kõiv

Top 8: Songs from singers' birth year
 Birgit Varjun – "Who Wants to Live Forever" by Queen
 Marten Kuningas – "Take On Me" by a-ha
 Getter Jaani – "See maailm uus" from the Disney film Aladdin
 Anis Arumets – "Smells Like Teen Spirit" by Nirvana
 Jaanus Saago – "Blaze Of Glory" by Jon Bon Jovi
 Kene Vernik – "Money For Nothing" by Dire Straits
 Ott Lepland – "Dude (Looks Like a Lady)" by Aerosmith 
 Anne Arrak – "First Time" by Robin Beck

Bottom three: Anis Arumets, Jaanus Saago, Kene Vernik
Eliminated: Kene Vernik

Top 7: Love songs
 Getter Jaani – "I'm a Believer" by The Monkees
 Jaanus Saago – "Nothing Else Matters" by Metallica
 Birgit Varjun – "Bitch" by Meredith Brooks
 Marten Kuningas – "Valged roosid" by Tarmo Pihlap
 Ott Lepland – "You Can Leave Your Hat On" by Randy Newman
 Anne Arrak – "Still Loving You" by Scorpions
 Anis Arumets – "Starlight" by Muse

Bottom three: Jaanus Saago, Anne Arrak, Marten Kuningas
Bottom two: Marten Kuningas, Anne Arrak
Eliminated: Anne Arrak

Top 6: Acoustic round
 Jaanus Saago – "Teisel pool vett" by Urmas Alender
 Birgit Varjun – "Dear Mr. President" by P!nk
 Ott Lepland – "Hüvasti, kollane koer" by Urmas Alender
 Getter Jaani – "The Climb" by Miley Cyrus
 Anis Arumets – "The Kill" by Thirty Seconds to Mars
 Marten Kuningas – "Space Oddity" by David Bowie

Bottom two: Getter Jaani, Anis Arumets
Eliminated: Anis Arumets

Top 5: Dance & country songs
 Getter Jaani – "Stop It (I Like It)" by Rick Guard
 Ott Lepland – "What's My Name" by Snoop Dogg
 Jaanus Saago – "Celebration" by Kool & the Gang
 Marten Kuningas – "Let's Dance" by David Bowie
 Birgit Varjun – "I Kissed a Girl" by Katy Perry
 Getter Jaani – "Ice Cream Freeze (Let's Chill)" by Miley Cyrus
 Ott Lepland – "Angel" by Sarah McLachlan
 Jaanus Saago – "The First Cut Is the Deepest" by Cat Stevens
 Marten Kuningas – "Love Will Tear Us Apart" by Joy Division
 Birgit Varjun – "Blue" by LeAnn Rimes

Bottom two: Birgit Varjun, Jaanus Saago
Eliminated: Jaanus Saago

Top 4: Ivo Linna songs & current hits
 Marten Kuningas – "Luiged läinud, lumi maas" 
 Birgit Varjun – "Sülitan vaid alla tuult"
 Getter Jaani – "Taas punab päiksekiirtes pihlapuu"
 Ott Lepland – "Kohtumistund"
 Marten Kuningas – "Moonduja" by Birgit Õigemeel
 Birgit Varjun – "Sober" by P!nk
 Getter Jaani – "Happy" by Leona Lewis
 Ott Lepland – "Light On" by David Cook

Bottom two: Getter Jaani, Birgit Varjun
Eliminated: Getter Jaani

Top 3: Song from mother's/father's youth & Duets
 Ott Lepland – "One Vision" by Queen
 Marten Kuningas – "Naer" by Virmalised
 Birgit Varjun – "Still Got the Blues" by Gary Moore
 Ott Lepland with Sandra Nurmsalu – "Rändajad" by Urban Symphony
 Marten Kuningas with Vaiko Eplik – "Blackbird" by The Beatles
 Birgit Varjun with Erik Mermaa – "Hero" by Chad Kroeger featuring Josey Scott

Eliminated: Marten Kuningas

Superfinale: The contestants' favourite & Christmas song & Winner's song 
The superfinal of Eesti otsib superstaari was held on December 20, 2009, in Linnahall Arena, Tallinn. Both superfinalists performed three songs: a well-known Christmas song, their own favourite performance of the season and winner's song. The winner was chosen by viewers through telephone and SMS voting.

 Ott Lepland - "Kohtumistund" by Ivo Linna
 Birgit Varjun - "Blue" by LeAnn Rimes
 Ott Lepland - "The Little Drummer Boy"
 Birgit Varjun - "Amazing Grace"
 Ott Lepland - "I Will Talk and Hollywood Will Listen" by Robbie Williams
 Birgit Varjun - "You Shook Me All Night Long" by AC/DC

Winner: Ott Lepland
Runner-up: Birgit Varjun

Elimination chart

External links
 Official website

References

2009 Estonian television seasons
2000s Estonian television series
Season 03